Arkell Cirque is a large cirque on the south face of the central Read Mountains, Shackleton Range. It was photographed from the air by the U.S. Navy in 1967 and surveyed from the ground by the British Antarctic Survey, 1968–71. It was named by the United Kingdom Antarctic Place-Names Committee after William Joscelyn Arkell, English geologist, a specialist in Jurassic stratigraphy and paleontology.

References
 

Cirques of Coats Land